Apison is an unincorporated community and census-designated place (CDP) in Hamilton County, Tennessee, United States. It is a rural area east of the city of Chattanooga, and borders Ooltewah, Collegedale, and north Georgia to the south. It is part of the Chattanooga, TN–GA Metropolitan Statistical Area. As of the 2020 census, its population was 4,428.

Apison is fifteen miles from Enterprise South Industrial Park, the location of Volkswagen North America.

History 
In 1881 the railroad came through a small settlement, now known as Apison, that had previously had its mail delivered by horse and buggy. The town then was known as O'Brian that was assigned by the railroad officials. The name was later changed because of another Tennessee town already having the same name. Due to the large deposits of Apison shale rock found along the railroad tracks, the town was renamed to its current name.

In 2001, the old Apison Elementary School was turned into a Tres Dias retreat center.

Demographics

2020 census

As of the 2020 United States census, there were 4,428 people, 987 households, and 803 families residing in the CDP.

Popular culture
Apison was depicted in the X-Files episode "The Field Where I Died."

Education
Apison Elementary School is located at 10433 East Brainerd Road.  Middle school and high school students may attend either East Hamilton or Ooltewah Middle School/High School.

References

Census-designated places in Tennessee
Unincorporated communities in Tennessee
Census-designated places in Hamilton County, Tennessee
Unincorporated communities in Hamilton County, Tennessee